Jaijaivanti or Jaijaiwanti is a Hindustani classical raga belonging to Khamaj Thaat. According to the Guru Granth Sahib, this raga is a mixture of two others: Bilaval and Sorath. The raga appears in the latter section in Gurbani, as only four hymns were composed by Guru Tegh Bahadur, the ninth Sikh guru. These hymns were added by his son and successor Guru Gobind Singh in 1705 A.D. This raga is not mentioned in any Indian classical scriptures on music nor in the Ragmala.

According to Guru Granth Sahib, Jaijaivanti (ਜੈਜਾਵੰਤੀ) expresses the feeling of happiness and satisfaction of achievement, while simultaneously conveying the sadness of losing. An apt simile for this Raag is that of a king winning a battle, however, he is then told that his son has perished on the battlefield. This Raag conveys a sense of having to put duty first. The duality of the emotions of joy and sorrow prevents overreacting to good or bad news. Raga Jaijaiwanti bears the closest resemblance to raga: Gara.

Composition

Aarohana

Avaroha

Pakad 

It is classified as a "Paramel Praveshak Raga", i.e. a raga that has the characteristics of a particular mela or thaat  and that has additional notes that  allow it to qualify under another mela or thaat. Jaijaivanti has both Shuddha Ga and Komal Ga. It also has Shuddha Ni and Komal Ni usage as well. If more stress or focus is put on the Shuddha Ga and Ni notes, the raga shows the characteristics of the Khamaj thaat. Whereas if more focus is applied to the Komal Ga and Komal Ni notes in the same raga, the characteristics of the Kafi Thaat are highlighted.

Possible notes 
Ni Sa Dha Ni (komal) Re, Re Ga (komal) Re Sa.
Pa Re Ga (komal) Re Sa, Ma Pa Ni (shuddha) Re (tar saptak) Ni (komal) Dha Pa, Dha Ma Ga Re, Re Ga (komal) Re Sa.

In Carnatic music 
Jaijaivanthi :

avarohanam : * , *

It is a janya ragam of the 28th melakarta ragam Harikambhoji.

Jeeva swaram :  and  

Anya swaram : * and *

Dwijavathi : 

ārohanam : 

avarohanam : *

Jeeva swaram :  and  

Anya swaram : * 

It is a janya ragam of the 28th melakarta ragam Harikambhoji. It is also known as Jujāvanti(formerly)/ Dwijavanthi(modern name) (pronounced Dvijāvanti) in the Carnatic tradition and in the Yakshagana theatre tradition.
It rubs shoulders with Sahana(carnatic), in certain phraseology. Desh ang or Sorath ang is not used in dwijavanti.There is absolutely no use or very less use of * {Kakali nishadam(carnatic)/Shuddh nishad(hindustani)}. Rendition of Dwijavanti is usually done with incorporating shades of Sahana and Bageshri and with its signature phrase : .

Film songs

Tamil

Hindi-Urdu

Albums

Tamil

Urdu 
 Ghazal: "Ghuncha-e-Shoq, Laga Hai Khilnay" (Singer: Ustad Mehdi Hasan, Notes: Re ga (komal) Re Sa Ma)
 Ghazal: "Dost Ban Kar Bhi Nahin" (Singer: Ustad Ghulam Ali)

Malayalam 

 "Oruneram Enkilum" (Singers: Yesudas, Chitra)

Performance 
"Jaijaivanti" is sung during the first prahar of the night—from 6:00 to 9:00  pm. It is generally recited in the summer or grishma. "Jaijaivanti" is sung by 2 aangs, i.e. the Desh aang and the Bageshri aang.

References 

Hindustani ragas
Ragas in the Guru Granth Sahib